Benjamin Cushing Duniway (November 21, 1907 – August 23, 1986) was a United States circuit judge of the United States Court of Appeals for the Ninth Circuit.

Education and career

Born on November 21, 1907, in Stanford, California, Duniway received a Bachelor of Arts degree in 1928 from Carleton College, a Bachelor of Laws in 1931 from Stanford Law School and a Bachelor of Arts in 1933 from the University of Oxford. He received a Master of Arts in 1964 from the University of Oxford. He entered private practice in San Francisco, California from 1933 to 1942 and from 1947 to 1959. He was a regional attorney for the Office of Price Administration in San Francisco and Washington, D.C. from 1945 to 1947. He was a Justice of the First District of the California Court of Appeal from 1959 to 1961.

Federal judicial service

Duniway was nominated by President John F. Kennedy on September 14, 1961, to a seat on the United States Court of Appeals for the Ninth Circuit vacated by Judge Albert Lee Stephens Sr. He was confirmed by the United States Senate on September 21, 1961, and received his commission on September 22, 1961. He assumed senior status on October 5, 1976. He served as a Judge of the Temporary Emergency Court of Appeals from 1979 to 1986. His service terminated on August 23, 1986, due to his death in Stanford.

References

Sources
 
 

Stanford Law School alumni
Carleton College alumni
1907 births
1986 deaths
Judges of the United States Court of Appeals for the Ninth Circuit
United States court of appeals judges appointed by John F. Kennedy
20th-century American judges
People from Stanford, California
Stanford University trustees
Alumni of Merton College, Oxford